Caleb Asa Scharf is a British-born astronomer and the director of the multidisciplinary Columbia Astrobiology Center at Columbia University, New York.  He received a B.Sc. in Physics from Durham University and a PhD in Astronomy from the University of Cambridge; he did postdoctoral work in X-ray astronomy and observational cosmology at the NASA Goddard Space Flight Center and the Space Telescope Science Institute in Maryland.

He has an extensive research record in observational cosmology but more recently works on topics in exoplanetary science and astrobiology. He is the author of the upper-level undergraduate textbook Extrasolar Planets and Astrobiology, published in 2008 by University Science Books, CA. This book won the 2011 Chambliss Astronomical Writing Award and medal from the American Astronomical Society. He has many published professional papers in peer-reviewed journals, with 109 papers listed in the SAO/NASA Astrophysics Data System (ADS); three have been cited over 100 times each:  the highest counts are 264 139, 116, all in The Astrophysical Journal.

His blog Life, Unbounded appears at Scientific American and covers topics in astronomy, exoplanetary science, and astrobiology.

Scharf is the author of a number of popular science books. Gravity's Engines: The Other Side of Black Holes (US subtitle: How Bubble-Blowing Black Holes Rule Galaxies, Stars, and Life in the Universe) was published in December 2012. It was listed as one of the New Scientist top 10 books to read in 2012 and as one of The Barnes and Noble Review Editors' Picks: Best Nonfiction of 2012. His next book, The Copernicus Complex, was published in 2014 by Farrar, Straus and Giroux, and in 2017 The Zoomable Universe, with illustrations by Ron Miller, was published by Scientific American/Farrar, Straus and Giroux.

Bibliography

Textbooks

Popular Science 
Scharf, Caleb A. (2012). Gravity's Engines: The Other Side of Black Holes (US subtitle: How Bubble-Blowing Black Holes Rules Galaxies, Stars, and Life in the Universe).
Scharf, Caleb A. (2014). The Copernicus Complex: Our Cosmic Significance in a Universe of Planets and Probabilities. New York: Scientific American / Farrar, Straus and Giroux.
Scharf, Caleb A.; illustrations by Ron Miller (2017). The Zoomable Universe: An Epic Tour Through Cosmic Scale, from Almost Everything to Nearly Nothing. New York: Scientific American / Farrar, Straus and Giroux.
Scharf, Caleb A. (2021); The Ascent of Information: Books, Bits, Genes, Machines, and Life's Unending Algorithm.
Riverhead Books.

Essays and reporting

References

External links

 Official home page at Columbia
 Scharf's blog at Scientific American
 
 Caleb Scharf, professional website

Living people
Year of birth missing (living people)
Place of birth missing (living people)
Alumni of University College, Durham
Alumni of the University of Cambridge
American astronomers
Astrobiologists
Scientific American people